Eriq Anthony Zavaleta (born August 2, 1992) is a professional footballer who plays as a center-back for Major League Soccer club LA Galaxy. Born in the United States, he represents the El Salvador national team.

Youth and college 
Zavaleta played his freshman and senior seasons of high school soccer at Westfield High School in Westfield, Indiana. He scored 25 goals and nine assists as a freshman and twenty goals and ten assists as a senior. He also spent his youth career with FC Pride, Real Salt Lake, and Chivas USA, and was also part of Columbus Crew's USL Super-20 championship team in 2011.

On February 7, 2011, Zavaleta signed a letter of intent to play college soccer at Indiana University. In his freshman year with the Hoosiers in 2011, Zavaleta started 22 games and led the team with ten goals and five assists and was also the team leader in points with 25. He went on to be named College Soccer News All-Freshman first team, NSCAA All-Great Lakes Region first team selection, Soccer America All-Freshman first team and Chicagoland Soccer News Player of the Year.

In his sophomore year, Zavaleta started all 24 matches and again was the team leader with 40 points, with 18 goals and four assists. He led the team to their eighth national title. One of the four assists came in the 2012 College Cup final against no. 3 Georgetown, when he set up teammate Nikita Kotlov for what turned out to be the title-clinching goal. He went on to be named Big Ten All-Tournament team, NSCAA third-team All-American, College Soccer News first-team All-American and the College Cup All-Tournament team. At Indiana University he was a member of the Kappa Sigma fraternity.

Club career

Seattle Sounders FC 
On January 5, 2013, it was announced by agent Ron Waxman that Zavaleta had signed a Generation Adidas contract with Major League Soccer, making him eligible for the 2013 MLS SuperDraft. On January 17, Zavaleta was selected 10th overall by Seattle Sounders FC and immediately added to the roster.  He made his professional debut on March 23, 2013, in a 1–0 loss to the San Jose Earthquakes.

Chivas USA 
On February 28, 2014, Chivas USA announced that they had added Zavaleta to their roster on loan from Seattle Sounders FC for one year. In 2014, he replaced Bobby Burling as the center back was out of play after he underwent a knee surgery.

Toronto FC 
On January 26, 2015, Toronto FC announced that they had traded their 2016 MLS SuperDraft second-round pick to Seattle for Zavaleta.

On September 5, 2015, Zavaleta scored his first goal for Toronto in a 2–1 loss against his former club, the Seattle Sounders. In 2016, he was briefly loaned to Toronto FC II.

On February 23, 2021, Zavaleta re-signed with Toronto FC. At the end of the season, his contract option was declined.

LA Galaxy 
On March 10, 2022, Zavaleta signed a one-year deal with LA Galaxy. He made his debut on April 19th 2022 against the San Diego Loyal SC in the U.S. Open Cup. He later made his MLS debut against Real Salt Lake on April 30th 2022. In February 2023, the Galaxy announced Zavaleta had signed a new two-year deal to remain with the club.

International career 
Zavaleta was part of the U.S. Soccer Residency program in 2008–09 and made 23 appearances for the United States U-17 national team during that stretch, including three appearances in the 2009 FIFA U-17 World Cup. Zavaleta mostly played as a defender with the under-17s.

He is eligible to play for both the United States national team and El Salvador.

In April 2021, it was reported that Zavaleta had gained clearance from FIFA to represent El Salvador. The next month on May 26, Zavaleta was called up to El Salvador ahead of their 2022 FIFA world Cup qualification matches. He debuted for El Salvador in a 7–0 2022 FIFA World Cup qualification win over United States Virgin Islands on June 5, 2021. He scored his first goal in a 3–0 2022 World Cup qualifier win over Antigua and Barbuda on June 8, 2021. In his third match on June 16, he was given the captain's armband to wear, after the team's captain was substituted out.

Personal life
Zavaleta is the son of Carlos and Kristi Zavaleta. He has one sister, Alexa and one brother, Casey. His father played professionally in the United States and was also a member of the El Salvador national team.  He is also the nephew of former MLS and U.S. national team defender, and his current coach at LA Galaxy and former coach at Toronto FC, Greg Vanney.

Career statistics

Club

International

International goals
Scores and results list El Salvador's goal tally first.

Honors 
Toronto FC
MLS Cup: 2017
Supporters' Shield: 2017
Canadian Championship: 2016, 2017, 2018
Trillium Cup: 2016, 2017, 2019

Indiana University
NCAA College Cup: 2012

Individual
 College Soccer News All-Freshman first team: 2011
 NSCAA All-Great Lakes Region first team: 2011
 Soccer America All-Freshman first team: 2011
 Chicagoland Soccer News Player of the Year (2): 2011, 2012
 Big Ten All-Tournament team: 2012
 NSCAA third-team All-American: 2012
 College Soccer News first-team All-American: 2012
 College Cup All-Tournament team: 2012
 Soccer America MVP first team: 2012

References

External links
 
 Biography at Indiana University.
 

1992 births
Living people
Salvadoran footballers
El Salvador international footballers
United States men's youth international soccer players
Salvadoran people of American descent
American sportspeople of Salvadoran descent
Citizens of El Salvador through descent
Association football defenders
Chivas USA players
Indiana Hoosiers men's soccer players
Major League Soccer players
North American Soccer League players
Toronto FC players
Toronto FC II players
People from Westfield, Indiana
San Antonio Scorpions players
Seattle Sounders FC draft picks
Seattle Sounders FC players
Soccer players from Indiana
USL Championship players
Salvadoran expatriate footballers
American expatriate soccer players
Expatriate soccer players in Canada
2021 CONCACAF Gold Cup players
LA Galaxy players